The 2018 Premier Volleyball League Open Conference is the sixth conference of the Premier Volleyball League (33rd conference of the former Shakey's V-League). The conference started on September 22, 2018 at the Filoil Flying V Centre, San Juan, Metro Manila, Philippines.

Teams played a double-round robin elimination round to determine the final four teams that will advance to the semifinals.

Participating teams

Preliminary round 

 Team standings

|}

Point system:
3 points = win match in 3 or 4 sets
2 points = win match in 5 sets
1 point  = lose match in 5 sets
0 point  = lose match in 3 or 4 sets

 Match results
All times are in Philippines Standard Time (UTC+08:00)

|}

Final round 

 All series are best-of-three.

Semifinals 
Rank 1 vs Rank 4

|}
Rank 2 vs Rank 3

|}

Finals 
3rd Place

|}
Championships

|}

Awards

Final standings

See also 
 2018 Spikers’ Turf Open Conference

References 

2018 in Philippine sport